KRI Kobra, is an Indonesian naval vessel of the Waigeo class patrol boats.

Notable deployments
Cobra and KAL Legian helped recover 22 of the bodies of the deceased from the Levina 1.

References

Patrol vessels of the Indonesian Navy
Naval ships of Indonesia